William Eckart Lehman (August 21, 1821 – July 19, 1895) was a Democratic member of the U.S. House of Representatives from Pennsylvania.

Biography 
William E. Lehman was born in Philadelphia, Pennsylvania.  He pursued preparatory studies, and graduated from the University of Pennsylvania at Philadelphia in 1841.  He studied law, was admitted to the bar in 1844 and commenced practice in Philadelphia.  He was appointed post office examiner for Pennsylvania and New York by President James K. Polk.

Lehman was elected as a Democrat to the Thirty-seventh Congress.  He was an unsuccessful candidate for renomination in 1862.  During the American Civil War, Lehman was the United States provost marshal of the first district of Pennsylvania with the rank of captain from April 25, 1863, to June 15, 1865.  Having an ample income, he did not engage in any business or professional activities and died in Atlantic City, New Jersey, in 1895.  Interment in St. Peter's Episcopal Church Cemetery in Philadelphia.

References 
  Retrieved on 2008-02-14
 The Political Graveyard

1821 births
1895 deaths
Politicians from Philadelphia
Pennsylvania lawyers
Union Army officers
University of Pennsylvania alumni
University of Pennsylvania Law School alumni
19th-century American Episcopalians
Democratic Party members of the United States House of Representatives from Pennsylvania
19th-century American politicians
Burials at St. Peter's churchyard, Philadelphia
19th-century American lawyers